MAVA Company was the Greek importer of Renault automobiles. In 1979, it decided to enter the car-production business introducing a passenger-utility car, a type then very popular in Greece for tax cetagorization reasons. MAVA assigned the creation of the car to Georgios Michael, a Greek designer credited with the design of Neorion Chicago, as well as that of several other Greek vehicles. Michael and his team completed the development and prototype construction (on Renault mechanicals) in record-time and the car, named Farma, was introduced the same year. MAVA had insisted that the car should be presented as a "Renault model" and thus the prototype was tested and approved by the French company.

The Farma, accordingly bearing the Renault logo, was produced in a variety of versions, including "passenger" and "van" types. A total of 4500 were built, including the "pure jeep-type" Σ model introduced in 1983, and some minor face-lifts. The attractive car had also received a modest publicity in the European press. By 1985, the Greek law had changed affecting the market for this type of vehicles, thus making their production unprofitable. Michael and his team then worked on a new model; the much more advanced (and particularly attractive) new Farma Change was introduced in 1985. By that time, though, MAVA had scrapped the whole project and only one car, the prototype of the new model, was built.

See also 
 Oyak-Renault
 Bulgarrenault

References 
L.S. Skartsis and G.A. Avramidis, "Made in Greece", Typorama, Patras, Greece (2003)  (republished by the University of Patras Science Park, 2007)
L.S. Skartsis, "Greek Vehicle & Machine Manufacturers 1800 to present: A Pictorial History", Marathon (2012)  (eBook)
 K. Bitsikokos, "Affordable cars made in Greece", Auto Bild (Hellas), issue 22, Feb 29, 2008

External links 
Farma in "Renault rarities"
Renault concepts (in French)
 

Defunct motor vehicle manufacturers of Greece
Cars of Greece
Renault